Olu Esigie was an Itsekiri traditional ruler. He succeeded his father Ogiame, Olu Ojoluwa after his demise. He was crowned Ogiame Esigie, the 5th Olu of Warri Kingdom at Ode-Itsekiri, the ancestral home of the Itsekiri. He ascended the throne of his father in 1570 and reigned until 1597, when he passed on. He was succeeded by his son, Olu Atorongboye (Olu Sebastian).

References

Nigerian traditional rulers
People from Warri